Pakistani village life is the traditional rural life of the people of Pakistan.

People in village  usually live in houses made of bricks, clay or mud. These typically have two or three rooms which house extended families. Although now they  prefer living by making separate home for each family (nuclear units) but they don't live far away from their relatives, and they are extending their villages by making more homes. Due to geographical and other socioeconomic diversity, different regions have slightly different physical and social layout. For example, in Gongrani, Balochistan, people live in homes built within cliff-side caves that are connected by walkways. Most of the villagers are farmers but other rural occupations include blacksmiths, hairdressers and tailorers, shepherds.

Rural social organization in Pakistan is marked by kinship and exchange relations. Socioeconomic status among rural Pakistani villagers is often based upon the ownership of agricultural land, which also may provide social prestige in village cultures. The majority of rural Pakistani inhabitants livelihoods is based upon the rearing of livestock, which also comprises a significant part of Pakistan's gross domestic product. Some livestock raised by rural Pakistanis include cattle and goats.

The traditional culture of the village is now subject to change due to the effects upon village society due to rural urbanization, and from the introduction of modern technology, such as pumps and tube wells for irrigation. Resistance to social and cultural changes exists among Pakistani village inhabitants, and varying methods of managing these changes have been tried.

Notes

References

Additional sources
 
 

Society of Pakistan
Rural society
Villages in Pakistan